St. Paul Catholic High School is a private, Roman Catholic high school in Bristol, Connecticut, United States. It is located in the Roman Catholic Archdiocese of Hartford. Its mascot is the falcon, and its colors are blue, white, and crimson.

Background
St. Paul was established in 1966 and was originally staffed by the Sisters of St. Joseph.

Athletics

The most recent team champions are:
Girls' basketball:  2009-2010 Class S State Championship
Boys' baseball: 2016, 2022 Class S State Championship

St. Paul offers over 19 varsity sports for boys and girls combined.

Notable alumni

 Cara Pavalock-D'Amato, member of the Connecticut House of Representatives
 Scott Lachance, NHL defenseman
 Byron Jones, DB for the Miami Dolphins (2020-present)
 Kristen Taekman, model and reality TV personality
 Steve Pikiell, head basketball coach of Rutgers University

References

External links
 
 Roman Catholic Archdiocese of Hartford

Catholic secondary schools in Connecticut
Buildings and structures in Bristol, Connecticut
Educational institutions established in 1966
1966 establishments in Connecticut